The white-tailed cotinga (Xipholena lamellipennis) is a species of bird in the family Cotingidae. It is endemic to Brazil in the northern portions of the Amazon Basin's southeast quadrant.

Its natural habitat is subtropical or tropical moist lowland forests.

Xipholena range overview
Of the three Xipholena genera, X. atropurpurea, the white-winged cotinga is located on southeastern coastal Brazil in a 125 km wide restricted range strip stretching about 3500 kilometers.

Pompadour cotinga, X. punicea and white-tailed cotinga, X. lamellipennis complete a total range of the Amazon Basin, with the white-tailed cotinga completing the entire range of the southeast Amazon quadrant, the northern portion. This range does not cross the Amazon River into the northeast quadrant with the Guianas. The range only abuts the southwest quadrant of the pompadour cotinga, with no overlapping.

The white-tailed cotinga's southeast Amazon Basin range encompasses the lower drainage, (about one third), of the Tocantins-Araguaia River system, and ends in the east at the Atlantic Ocean in the state of Maranhão. To the west, it encompasses the lower reaches of the tributary, the Tapajós River.

References

External links
 

white-tailed cotinga
Birds of Brazil
Birds of the Amazon Basin
Endemic birds of Brazil
white-tailed cotinga
Taxonomy articles created by Polbot
Taxa named by Frédéric de Lafresnaye